Inside Islam is a History Channel documentary on the history of Islam and its modern day challenges  including a crisis of authority and significant divisions among many of its sects. It depicts Islam as a peaceful religion, with several similarities to Judaism and Christianity, and argues that the primary reason that people fear Islam is due to fundamentalists. It also discusses Muhammad and his disagreements with his tribe who disapproved of his monotheistic religion, the Nation of Islam and the Arab–Israeli conflict. It first aired on 4 September 2002.

It is also played on Wealth TV.

See also
 List of Islamic films

References

External links
Inside Islam - The History Channel - Youtube

2002 documentary films
2002 films
History (American TV channel) original programming
Documentary films about Islam
2002 in Islam